Golo is a settlement and rural district located in Central Darfur, Sudan.  The start of the Darfur conflict is conventionally dated to an attack claimed by the Darfur Liberation Front upon Golo on 26 February 2003.  Over the course of the conflict, it changed hands between the government and rebel forces several times.

External links 
 DLF captured Golo the Provisional Headquarters South West of Elfashir City , press release of the Darfur Liberation Front, 14 March 2003
 Rebels battling for Darfur town, BBC News, 26 January 2006

Populated places in Central Darfur